The Socialist Environment and Resources Association (SERA), founded in 1973, is an independent environmental association affiliated to the UK Labour Party as a socialist society. More recently it has used the name "SERA – the Labour Environment Campaign", rather than its full name.

SERA campaigns to promote progressive environmental policies within the Labour Party. SERA's co-Chairs are Lisa Trickett and Ken Penton.

SERA has members and local groups across the country, and has good links both within the UK Labour Party and outside the Labour Party with many environmental groups. SERA has contributed to policy development on transport, energy, water, waste, and biodiversity.

The SERA National Executive numbers 16 people, elected annually at an annual general meeting held in November. Executive members currently include Alan Whitehead, Daniel Zeichner, Alex Sobel, Sandy Martin, Leonie Cooper, and Huw Irranca-Davies.

References

External links
 

1973 establishments in the United Kingdom
Labour Party (UK) socialist societies
Organisations based in the London Borough of Islington
Socialist organisations in the United Kingdom